Francis Xavier Lasance [F. X. Lasance] (January 24, 1860 – December 11, 1946) was an American priest and writer of Roman Catholic devotional works.

Early years
Born in Cincinnati, Ohio, he was the son of Augustine and Philamena (Detert) Lasance. He was educated at St. Mary's School and St. Xavier College (Cincinnati) and St. Meinrad Archabbey (Indiana), and was ordained by the Most Reverend William Henry Elder, Archbishop of Cincinnati, on May 24, 1883.

Parish work
During the next seven years, Lasance served as curate in various parishes in the Archdiocese of Cincinnati including churches in Kenton, Reading, Dayton, Lebanon, and Monroe, Ohio. He also served as chaplain at Our Lady's Summit, in East Walnut Hills, in Cincinnati.  Ill health forced him to relinquish parish work in 1890; from then on, he lived a "retired, semi-invalid existence" at St. Francis Hospital, Cincinnati, writing various books on spiritual subjects and serving as spiritual director of the Tabernacle Society.

Writings
He wrote thirty-nine volumes, including:
 Thoughts on the Religious Life (1907)
 My Prayer Book (1913)
 Reflections for Religious (1920)
 Our Lady Book (1924)
 The New Roman Missal (1937) (with the Rev. Fr. Augustine Walsh, OSB)
 Patience: Thoughts on the Patient Endurance of Sorrows and Suffering (1937)
 Kindness, The Bloom of Charity, Thoughts on Fraternal Charity (1938)
 The Catholic Girl's Guide
 Manna of the Soul
 Visits to Jesus in the Tabernacle, Hours and Half-hours of Adoration before the Blessed Sacrament (1897)
 Road to Happiness
 With Saints and Sages
 The Young Man's Guide
 Let Us Pray
 Come Holy Spirit: Prayer Book for Religious(1904)
 Lift Up Your Hearts
 Blessed Sacrament Book
 My God and My All
 Holy Souls Book
 Sacred Heart Book
 Little Manual of St. Anthony
 Rejoice in the Lord
 The Prisoner of Love
 With God (1911)
 Sweet Sacrament, We Thee Adore
 Emmanuel
 Holiness and Happiness
 Novenas and Devotions in Honor of the Holy Ghost
 Self-Conquest
 Remember
 Let Us Go to Jesus
 Manual of the Holy Eucharist: Conferences on the Blessed Sacrament and Eucharistic Devotions
 Mass Devotions and Readings on the Mass
 Peace, Not as the World Gives
 Pious Preparation for First Holy Communion: With a Retreat of Three Days
 Prayer Book for Religious
 Sermons on the Blessed Sacrament: and Especially for the Forty Hours' Adoration
 Short Visits to the Blessed Sacrament

He also compiled and edited the Blessed Sacrament Book (1913).

His works were translated into numerous languages. In total, his texts were published in the millions. He refused all compensation for his work and asked that any profits be donated to charity or toward providing his works free of charge to those unable to purchase them. For his devotional works, he was given a special blessing by Pope Pius XI on May 10, 1927.

A number of Lasance's writings have been reprinted and are currently available from various traditionalist Catholic publishers, including My Prayer Book, Manna of the Soul, Blessed Sacrament Book, and The New Roman Missal (reprinted in 1993 by Christian Book Club of America), which at present is one of the most popular hand missals favored by American traditionalist Catholics.

Death
Father Lasance died at the age of eighty-six, in his native city.

References
 New Catholic Encyclopedia, The Catholic University of America, 1967.
 The American Catholic Who's Who (Volume 7, 1946 – 1947), page 244.
 "Papal Honors Go to Modest Priest," Cincinnati Enquirer, June 30, 1927.

External links

 

Lasance, F. X.
Lasance, F. X.
1946 deaths
1860 births
St. Xavier High School (Ohio) alumni